Astrosociology, sociology of outer space, or sociology of the universe is the study of the relationship between outer space, extraterrestrial places, and the wider universe and society. It is an interdisciplinary study between space-related sciences and sociology that seeks to understand the impact of human society outside our current planetary system.

Astrosociology focuses on space exploration and related issues alongside the social and cultural dimensions of outer space from the viewpoint of human civilisation.

History 
Astrosociology started as a subfield and interdisciplinary area of study in 2003 to research the two-way relationship that exists between outer space and society, or astrosocial phenomena (e.g. the social, cultural, and behavioral patterns related to outer space).

In 2008, Jim Pass created the Astrosociology Research Institute (ARI) as a nonprofit research centre to advance the field of astrosociology.

Research areas

Commercialisation of space 
The process and phenomenon of globalisation can be seen to be expanding past our planetary system and into space commercialisation. The market drives of capitalism and neo-liberal presents space as an untapped resource for marketisation. This presents a shift from the Space Race and astropolitics of the Cold War and into a new era of space commercialisation. Examples of this seen in Blue Origin and SpaceX that offer private contract services for government agencies like NASA.

Extraterrestrial life 
The existence of extraterrestrial life, life outside of Earth, is an ongoing scientific search as well as societal debate. Astrobiology to planetary geology are some of the disciplines interested in finding life elsewhere in space. Astrosociology intersects these by exploring the social dimensions of finding extraterrestrial life – exploring the impact of human systems throughout religious to economic.

There is also research into how these extraterrestrial places and potential life interlink with our own world, with the global environmental and ecological systems here on Earth, and vice versa. This potential relationship of space and extraterrestrial places impacting our society, humanity, and humans as we know ourselves alongside our impact elsewhere plays an ongoing astrosociologcial paradigm within research.

Human civilisations beyond Earth 
A focus of astrosociology is the presence of human populations outside the confines of Earth. A paper presented at the American Institute of Physics (AIP) by Jim Pass in 2006 outlined: "For a number of reasons, the construction of a single space colony represents a future social reality strongly likely to play itself out repeatedly as the twenty‐first century advances".

The ramifications of societal settings beyond earth, with advancing new technology and logistical programmes like SpaceX and Deep Space Transport, create questions for the continuation of society outside of Earth. A promenant issue sits around time and how the passing of time is understood outside of the day-night cycle here on Earth.

Human existence outside of Earth creates new areas of astrosocial and astropolitical dimensions that our societies have never experienced so far. Astrosociology presents space currently as an extra-social factor (e.g. not related to our social world), as a social construct outside of our social experience, and as related based on public opinion. As our explorations into space continue to breakdown the hard divide of society and the universe, space becomes more and more a social factor within our societal experiences.

Space exploration 
Understanding future expansion into places like the Moon, Mars, and elsewhere outside of Earth needs a reflection on the sociological factors throughout exploration phases. An example of this is looking at past space explorations and social dynamics, from leadership relations among astronauts to work-rest scheduling, to provide sociological insight into future space exploration missions. As humans remain in an era phase of space exploration and travel, the astrosociological focus is often on the micro societal aspects of space that are created in situations like the International Space Station and future space missions.

See also 
 Human spaceflight
 Human presence in space
 Space
 Politics of outer space

References 

Interdisciplinary subfields of sociology
Outer space